Ronald Brautigam (born 1954) is a Dutch concert pianist, best known for his performances of Beethoven's piano works on the fortepiano.

Born in Amsterdam, Brautigam studied there with Jan Wijn (1971-79), then he left to study in London with John Bingham (1980-82) and in the United States with Rudolf Serkin (1982-83). His skill as a pianist was recognised by Dutch musicians and in 1984 he was awarded the Nederlandse Muziekprijs. In 2015 his Beethoven recordings received the Edison Award and the annual German Record Critics' Prize.

Brautigam lives in Amsterdam with his wife Mary. Since September 2011 he has been a professor at the University of Music of the Basel Music Academy.

Recordings 

 Ronald Brautigam, Isabelle van Keulen. Grieg, Elgar, Sibelius. Music for Violin and Piano. Label: Challenge 
 Ronald Brautigam. Ludwig van Beethoven, Joseph Haydn, Wolfgang Amadeus Mozart. Complete works for solo piano. Played on Graf, Walter and Stein fortepiano replicas by Paul McNulty. Label: Bis Records
 Ronald Brautigam. Felix Mendelssohn. Piano Concertos. Played on a Pleyel fortepiano replica by Paul McNulty. Label: Bis Records
 Ronald Brautigam (piano), Peter Masseurs (trumpet), Royal Concertgebouw Orchestra, Riccardo Chailly (conductor). Dmitri Shostakovich, Piano Concerto No.1, Op.35. Played on modern piano. Label: London Classics.
 Ronald Brautigam, Sharon Bezaly (flute). Prokofiev, Schubert, Dutilleux, Jolivet. Works for Flute and Piano. Label: Bis Records.
 Ronald Brautigam, Nobuko Imai. Max Reger. Works for Viola. Label: Bis Records.

References

External links
Bio at his official site
Official site of Alba Music Press, publishers of Ronald Brautigam's reconstruction of Beethoven’s little known Piano Concerto in E flat major WoO4
Bachtrack interview by David Karlin: Back to the real Beethoven: Ronald Brautigam on historical pianos
Pianostreet: Exciting Time Travels – Interview with Ronald Brautigam

Dutch classical pianists
Dutch fortepianists
Musicians from Amsterdam
1954 births
Living people
21st-century classical pianists